Benito Caballero Garza (born 24 September 1965) is a Mexican politician and lawyer affiliated with the PRI. He currently serves as Deputy of the LXII Legislature of the Mexican Congress representing Nuevo León.

References

1965 births
Living people
Politicians from Monterrey
20th-century Mexican lawyers
Institutional Revolutionary Party politicians
21st-century Mexican politicians
Deputies of the LXII Legislature of Mexico
Members of the Chamber of Deputies (Mexico) for Nuevo León
21st-century Mexican lawyers